Giovanni Amighetti (born 21 February 1971 in Parma, Italy) is a contemporary Italian musician.

He studied classical piano and began playing with avantgarde band Fondamenta and AREA drummer Giulio Capiozzo in late eighties. With the world music boom he started promoting in Italy some of the Real World recording label artists. 
His first world music CD production is "No, Russia cannot be perceived by wit" by Terem Quartet, realised by Schott Musik/Intuition in 1999. 
Then he worked on many studio and live projects, often collaborating with musicians from Mari Boine Band (Gjermund Silset, Helge Norbakken, Roger Ludvigsen).

Among others: "Salimie" with Ayub Ogada, "La voce del mondo" with 
Tiziana Ghiglioni and "Anastasia" with Vladimir Denissenkov.

He has composed music with Guo Yue for DVD Shan Qi by Ozella Music, 2009.

In 1996 he played with Ayub Ogada in front of an audience of 500.000 by the Colosseum in Rome for FAO

He is an honorary citizen of Santa Cruz, California.
 
In contemporary music also worked on some solo and Fondamenta projects, with Union Nowhere, on Guido Ponzini's cd "Twilight town" and with the Shan Qi ensemble featuring Chinese flute player Guo Yue. Produced Wu Fei's "A Distant Youth" in 2007, featuring Fred Frith, Carla Kihlstedt and Helge A. Norbakken.
He is also engaged in multimedia productions merging music and interactive digital media with Arvmusic.

In 2009 worked with Adel Salameh and Naziha Azzouz for "Dardasha" and with Nintendo for the Wii Music Live gigs,  in 2010 he has been main producer for historical work "La musica di Secondo Casadei" by Casadei Sonora. In 2012 he recorded "windy valley" with Morricone-related classical players using a rig of old ARP, Prophet and Moog synthesizers.

Amighetti has collaborated with Nasa/JPL scientist Michele Vallisneri in "Tales from the Cosmos" and played in and produced new album by Bernardi with Skunk Anansie guitarist Martin Kent (Ace) and Michael Urbano.

In 2015 is out his produced CD by Faris Amine "Mississippi to Sahara" for Reaktion/Wrasse Records, which is research upon the origins of blues music in the Tuareg tradition.
Nominee as best fusion album in 2016 by Songlines and awarded as one of 10 all-time best Tuareg records.

Giovanni also played in another JPL related work with English guitarist David Rhodes (guitarist) (Peter Gabriel), Jeff Coffin (Dave Matthews Band), Wu Fei, Paolo Vinaccia and Roger Ludvigsen called "The Fermi Paradox". Also in 2015 is his production meeting by Officina Zoe and Mari Boine for "La notte della Taranta".

In 2018 he recorded piano and synths for "A classical improvisation" a contemporary classical concept of creating music directly in the studio sessions together with Tiziana Ghiglioni and Angela Benelli. Also worked live with percussionists Sidiki Camara and Trilok Gurtu, composer Ray Lema and as guest with L'orchestra Popolare La Notte della Taranta directed by Daniele Durante.

In 2020 during the COVID-19 pandemic he helped in bringing Daniele Durante's Taranta project to the Castello Sforzesco in Milano for the sole gig of the ensemble that year. He was also musician and artistic coordinator for the Italy for China music and video recording in Teatro Asioli Correggio – Ahymé Festival with Daniele Durante, Franco Mussida Premiata Forneria Marconi, Moreno Conficconi – Venice Film Festival Siae prize winner.

In 2021 Amighetti recorded and released the album "Play@Esagono vol.1" with guitarist Luca Nobis and various guests including Jeff Coffin from Dave Matthews Band, Petit Solo Diabate and Fiorenzo Tassinari. The album has been followed by a serie of eleven live videos filmed by director Luca Fabbri.

Selected discography 

1999: No, Russia Cannot Be Perceived by wit – Terem Quartet – (Intuition) producer
2000: Tanguru Salimie – Ayub Ogada, Roger Ludvigsen, Giovanni Amighetti, Gjermund Silset, Helge Norbakken – (Intuition)
2001: La Voce del Mondo – Tiziana Ghiglioni, Ludvigsen, Giovanni Amighetti, Gjermund Silset, Helge Norbakken, Meola – (Arv)
2001: Anastasia – Vladimir Denissenkov, Silset, Norbakken, Amighetti – (Arv)
2002: The Beautiful High Coast – Alf Haggkvist – (Arv) executive producer
2003 And if the world... – Giovanni Amighetti, Laura Love, Joji Hirota, Guo Yue, Ayub Ogada, Helge Norbakken, Annbjorg Lien, Adel Salameh (Iamedia)
2006: Twilight Town – Guido Ponzini, Guo Yue, Amighetti, Cottifogli, Meola – (Ozella Music)
2007: A Distant Youth – Wu Fei, Fred Frith, Carla Kihlstedt, Helge A. Norbakken – (Forrest Hill) producer
2009: Shan Qi / Energy of the Mountains – Guo Yue, Giovanni Amighetti, Wu Fei, Ponzini, Helge Norbakken – (Ozella Music)
2010: Plugin Contemporary Music – Guido Ponzini, Angela Benelli, Gambini, Amighetti – (Porter Records)
2011: La Musica di Secondo Casadei – Conficconi, Tassinari, Benelli, Vallicelli – (Arv-Casadei Sonora) producer
2012: Dardasha – Adel Salameh, Naziha Azzouz, Amighetti, Ponzini, Fulvio Maras – (Arv)
2012: Windy Valley – Claudio Ferrarini, Giovanni Amighetti, Andreoli, Benelli, Ponzini, Meola – (Arte Sonora)
2015: Mississippi to Sahara – Faris Amine, Leo Welch – (Wrasse) producer
2017: Re-Birth – Pier Bernardi, Ace, Giovanni Amighetti, Michael Urbano – (Irma Records)
2018: A classical improvisation – Giovanni Amighetti, Tiziana Ghiglioni, Angela Benelli, Pier Bernardi (Muki)
2021: Incontri sul Palco – Giovanni Amighetti, Moreno Conficconi, Franco Mussida, Daniele Durante (video – Esagono)
2021: Play@Esagono vol.1 – Giovanni Amighetti, Luca Nobis, Petit Solo Diabate, Jeff Coffin, Fiorenzo Tassinari, Valerio "Combass" Bruno (Esagono Dischi – Bollettino)

References

1971 births
Living people
Italian male composers
Italian male pianists
21st-century pianists
21st-century Italian male musicians